Scotiophyes subtriangulata is a species of moth of the family Tortricidae. It is found in Fujian, China.

References

	

Moths described in 2009
Archipini